The 2015 Hoff Open was a professional tennis tournament played on clay courts. It was the first edition of the tournament which was part of the 2015 ATP Challenger Tour. It took place in Moscow, Russia between 8 and 14 June 2015.

Singles main-draw entrants

Seeds

 1 Rankings are as of May 25, 2015.

Other entrants
The following players received wildcards into the singles main draw:
  Philipp Davydenko
  Ivan Gakhov
  Daniil Medvedev
  Evgenii Tiurnev

The following players received entry from the qualifying draw:
  Patricio Heras
  Anton Zaitcev
  Mikhail Elgin
  Thiago Monteiro

The following players received entry as a lucky loser into the main draw:
  Maxim Dubarenco

Doubles main-draw entrants

Seeds

1 Rankings as of May 25, 2015.

Other entrants
The following pairs received wildcards into the doubles main draw:
  Ivan Gakhov /  Evgenii Tiurnev
  Philipp Davydenko /  Alexey Vatutin
  Daniil Medvedev /  Anton Zaitcev

Champions

Singles

  Daniel Muñoz de la Nava def.  Radu Albot, 6–0, 6–1.

Doubles

  Renzo Olivo /  Horacio Zeballos def.  Julio Peralta /  Matt Seeberger, 7–5, 6–3.

External links
Official Website

Hoff Open
2015
2015 in Russian tennis